Sainte-Florence is a former commune in the Vendée department in the Pays de la Loire region in western France. Since January 1, 2016, it is part of Essarts-en-Bocage.

See also
Communes of the Vendée department

References

Former communes of Vendée